The T platform, or T-body, can refer to two different automobile platforms produced by General Motors, both used for subcompact cars.

 1974–2008 GM T platform (RWD)
 1979–2016 GM T platform (FWD)

T